Trans Amadi International School (TAIS), formerly Michelin School, is a private non-denominational preschool and elementary school in Port Harcourt, Rivers State. It was established in 1980 for the children of the employees of the then Michelin Factory in Trans Amadi, but later became the Trans Amadi International School in 1988.

Presently, the school continues to cater for children of all nationalities aged between 2 and 11. The school is located at 32 St. Andrew's Street, Rumuobiakani, Trans Amadi in Obio-Akpor local government area.

See also
List of schools in Port Harcourt

References

External links

Private schools in Port Harcourt
Educational institutions established in 1980
Primary schools in Rivers State
Obio-Akpor
1980 establishments in Nigeria
1980s establishments in Rivers State